Buddy Mission Bond is a 2021 adventure video game developed by Ruby Party and published by Nintendo for the Nintendo Switch. It has character design by mangaka Yusuke Murata. The game was revealed at a Nintendo Direct Mini: Partner Showcase on October 28 and released on January 29, 2021 in Japan and August 20, 2021 in Korea and Taiwan.

Gameplay 
Buddy Mission Bond is a visual novel adventure game split up into several missions. Gameplay is split up into two different parts. The first part requires the player to choose two of the four main characters to form a pair of buddies that look for clues and interview citizens in a visual novel format. The second part sees the buddies infiltrate a villain's base in a traditional third-person view. The infiltration route taken by the player depends on specific clues found in the first phase. Throughout each mission, a "Hero Gauge"  is present, which acts as a score mechanism that increases or decreases based on dialogue choices, investigation methods, and infiltration methods used at the end of a mission. The overall score is displayed as a rank after each mission.

Story 
Buddy Mission Bond takes place on Mikagura Island, the international center for show business. The protagonist Luke Williams is a police officer who dreams of becoming a hero who and emulating his late father, a policeman who died in the line of duty. One day, the police station Luke works at is sent a video showing the kidnapping of a woman. Disobeying his superior's orders to not investigate, Luke tracks down and infiltrates the kidnapper's hideout. However, he runs into "Phantom Thief Beast" Aaron, a man who is alleged to have caused several hundred billion dollars worth of public property damage. The two team up to track down the kidnappers. Eventually they learn of the existence of a secret criminal syndicate “DISCARD” that operates from the shadows. To stop DISCARD, Luke and Aaron team up with the ninja Mokuma and conman Chelsey in order to create the undercover investigation team called "BOND". Along the way, Luke slowly starts to uncover the truth behind his father's death.

Development 

During the development of the Nintendo Switch, seeking new avenues and genres to attract people to the platform, Nintendo approached Ruby Party to develop an Otome game for the platform. Ruby Party, who at the time had no experience with home console development, pitched a romance game, which Nintendo greenlit around 2016. However, during the development of the title, the project's scale grew from a romance title, to one focusing on multiple, different kinds of bonds.

Reception 
The game received fairly positive reviews from critics. Famitsu remarked that there was "a good balance between the ADV parts and the Action parts. They're both high quality."

References 

2021 video games
Detective video games
Video games about ninja
Video games about police officers
Video games developed in Japan
Nintendo Switch games
Nintendo Switch-only games